Mary Jordan (officially Mary Kross; born 14 August 1969) is an American filmmaker, artist, activist and social justice advocate based in New York City. She grew up in the Bronx and in Toronto, Ontario, Canada. She studied literature, cultural and social anthropology and art. 
She has lived in Australia, India, Thailand and Myanmar and traveled in more than 50 countries. At the age of 18, after a trip through North Africa, she made her first documentary film, a work about female circumcision. Jordan was especially interested in rites of passage and in matriarchal and polygamous societies, like in Papua New Guinea. At the age of 20 she was the producer of Canadian directors like Steve Chase and Marco Brambilla. In Sydney, Australia she founded the production firm Indigo Blue for music videos and commercials.

Since 2005 she is mainly living and working in New York. In 2005 she had already been acclaimed by the magazine filmmaker as one of the 25 "new faces of independent film-making". The same year, in the Old Chelsea Y.M.C.A. in New York she held an exhibition about Jack Smith, including films, photographs and radio-broadcasts of his as well as interviews with his friends. In New York she set up a performance art troupe called Parthenogenesis who performed in venues from CBGB's, the Box, Canal Room and to many underground theatres and lofts. She directed 42 different performances with the troupe.

Mary Jordan is the Founder and Creative Director of Word Above the Street, a not-for-profit established in 2010. Leveraging the transformational power of art and technology, Word Above the Street pioneers fresh methods of communication to produce visionary art exhibitions that capture the imagination, stir the conscience, and have the power to change the world. While working on an ethnographic film about the Hammer people in Ethiopia, Jordan became acutely aware of the extreme challenges that the population faced in accessing clean water. Galvanized by this experience, Jordan was determined to create an awareness campaign around the issue of water scarcity. The Water Tank Project is Mary Jordan’s current venture and Word Above the Street's inaugural project. In the summer of 2014, carefully selected rooftop tanks across New York City will be temporarily wrapped with original artwork on the subject of water. This production will redefine the skyline across all five boroughs and affect millions of people around the world. Jordan spoke at the Festival of Ideas for the New City in 2011, where she presented The Water Tank Project, and at PolicyLink Equity Summit 2011 in Detroit, where she was a guest speaker. She is also developing a curriculum for the Earth Institute at Columbia University on art and advocacy.

Jordan spoke on The Water Tank Project and the intersection of art and advocacy at the Swiss Arts Council Pro Helvetia conference at the Venice Architecture Biennale on October 3, 2012.

In September 2013 Jordan spoke at the Social Good Summit along with Al Gore, Melinda Gates and other. She inspired the crowd with a speech on water that had the audience chanting "put water above all" 

Jordan has become a speaker for water and sustainability and has spoken at educational institutions such as NYU, Columbia University and the New School.

Filmmaker
Mary Jordan’s first feature-length film, Jack Smith and the Destruction of Atlantis,
produced by the American artist Richard Prince, was named one of the top ten A-list movies of 2007 by Entertainment Weekly.
Exhibited worldwide, it received the Tribeca Film Festival Jury Award, the Best Documentary Award from the Torino International Film Festival, the Jury Award for the International Leipzig Festival for Documentary and Animated Film and the Jury Award for Extraordinary Documentary Film Talent. Noted for its boundary-breaking aesthetic, it was exhibited at the Venice Biennial, Haus der Kulturen der Welt in Berlin, Brisbane Powerhouse, ISSUE Project Room,
and Nuit Blanche in Paris, and has been utilized by film schools around the globe, including NYU and the New School. On September 19, 2002, Jordan filmed an interview with Branford Marsalis for Marsalis Music. Filmmaker Magazine named Jordan one of the top 25 New Faces of Independent Film in 2005 

The recipient of grants from Judith Rothschild, the Agnes Gund Foundation, the Ford Foundation, and Frameline, Jordan was also one of the first artists to be invited to perform in Performa, the highly acclaimed Performance Art Biennial in New York City run by Roselee Goldberg.
Mary Jordan was featured in Nathan Shedroff’s book Experience Design first published by New Riders and now Experience Design Books. Shedroff is an experience strategist and has designed experiences in a variety of media, especially interactive and information design and branding. In his book he lists 100 great design experiences including Mary Jordan’s performance series, The Burmese Tea Ceremony.

Her own background as a painter, artist, and performance artist, meanwhile, has caused her selection as director of upcoming features on artists Ed Ruscha and Richard Prince. Jordan is currently making a feature-length art film on the performance group the Angels of Light from San Francisco. This is a film to be made for free and given for free to the public.
Angels of Light will be features at the Museum of Contemporary Art Denver’s upcoming exhibition, West of Center: Art and the Counterculture Experiment in America, 1965-1977.

In 2011 in Tallinn, Jordan directed and orchestrated a performance with dancers from the Ballet Preljocaj, the Vox choir and composer Tõnu Kaljuste.

Public art projects
In 2010 Jordan founded and became the Creative Director of Word Above the Street, a non-profit international arts organization dedicated to combining art and cultural programming with social advocacy based in New York City. Her newest venture, ‘The Water Tank Project,’ utilizes New York City’s water tanks for a large-scale public artwork that will draw attention to the global water crisis. In 2011 the Ford Foundation awarded Word Above the Street a grant to develop the Water Tank Project. In May 2011 Jordan spoke about The Water Tank Project at the Festival of Ideas.
In November 2013, The Water Tank Project, directed by Jordan, established exclusive media sponsorship with Hearst Corporation. The Project was featured in the April 2014 issue of Town & Country Magazine and in the May 2014 issue of Marie Claire.

The idea of the outdoor museum along the New York City skyline dedicated to the global water crisis has been well received by artists, philanthropists, scientists, educators, real estate professionals and city officials. With participation of artists such as Ed Ruscha, John Baldessari, Jeff Koons, Andy Goldsworthy, Carrie Mae Weems, Julie Mehretu and Lawrence Weiner; financing from the Booth Ferris Foundation, the Ford Foundation, the Rockefeller Foundation New York City Cultural Innovation Fund and the Agnes Gund AG Foundation; and partnerships with STUDIO IN A SCHOOL, the Columbia Water Center, the project is poised for successful execution. The curatorial committee features leading figures in the art world, including Lisa Dennison, Toby Devan Lewis and Neville Wakefield.

Speaking Engagements
On September 12, 2012, with the President's wife and a selected group including the Ambassador to Finland, Mary Jordan spoke on Imbi Paju's book and on the subject of memory and healing.

On April 5, 2013 Jordan spoke in New York City at the Columbia Water Center's (Columbia University) event: Make Your WaterMark: The Water Crisis and Campus Activism.

Jordan spoke at The New York Times Cities For Tomorrow on April 22, 2014. This conference allowed public and private sector thought leaders from around the globe to convene and examine the issues that will define, going forward, the creation of a new urban landscape – with an emphasis on sustainability, smart cities and resiliency. She addressed socially responsible new ideas, designed projects and innovative products by discussing The Water Tank Project.

On May 9, 2014 Jordan gave a talk at TEDxTallinn about public art and water conservation. Her talk focused on her experiences and how they led to her inspiration of using public art to raise awareness about serious environmental and social problems. She emphasized making a positive difference by inspiring people to take action.

Jordan spoke about Sustaining Art Communities in the Face of Gentrification on June 1, 2014. This panel was held at the NEWD ART FAIR in Brooklyn, New York. Jordan was accompanied by Hrag Vartanian from Hyperallergic, Deborah Brown from Storefront, and William Powhida, an institutional critique artist who has been vocal about artist rights and economics.

In September 2014 Jordan was part of the Media Rise festival in Washington DC where she spoke at a panel about Environmental Sustainability. She was accompanied by filmmaker Jeff Orlowiski, Ippon Matsu Beer founder Kota Kobayashi and Creative Conservationist and National Geographic Emerging Explorer Asher Jay.

Jordan was chosen as a face of Revlon in May 2014. The topic was on women being bold and making changes in the world. A television show featuring her and three other aspiring activists will be televised later this year. The exposure will be featured in Elle, Marie Claire and numerous other publications.

Mary Jordan has worked with institutions such as FIAF (French Institute Alliance Francasie) in New York. In 2020 she helped to support presenting a number of academy award winning films and performances.

Film festivals participation
She has exhibited her film work at festivals including BFI London Film Festival, International Film Festival Rotterdam, Los Angeles Film Festival, Seattle International Film Festival, Copenhagen International Film Festival, Sydney Film Festival, Pacific Film & Television Commission. Her work has been theatrically released and exhibited at Film Forum in New York City, on the Sundance Channel, and on multiple network stations. Her own background as a painter, artist, and performance artist, meanwhile, has caused her selection as director of upcoming features on artists Ed Ruscha.

Human rights documentaries
Jordan has also produced documentary work in Burma, Africa, Indonesia, and India. She has worked with Médecins Sans Frontières (Doctors Without Borders) in the Mae Sod Refugee Camp from 1997-1998 on the Thai-Burmese border,
with the Millennium Foundation, the International Center for Human Rights and Tolerance Education in NYC, and was chosen by the Children’s Movement Organization to direct their feature documentary on the war torn children of Bosnia.

Jordan worked with the famed gospel church Mentorship Program to document their programs and children in Glide Memorial Church Documentary, San Francisco. https://www.glide.org/

Other festivals
BFI London Film Festival
British Film Institute 
International Film Festival Rotterdam  
Los Angeles Film Festival  
Seattle International Film Festival  
Sydney Film Festival  
Pacific Film & Television Commission  
AVANTO & THE FINNISH Film ARCHIVE 
Brisbane International Film Festival  
Festival du Nouveau Cinema 
Leeds International Film Festival  
Provincetown International Film Festival  
Milwaukee LGBT Film & Video Festival 
Philadelphia QFest  
Copenhagen International Documentary Festival

Art work display
Haus der Kulturen der Welt — New York : States of Mind. Berlin, Germany. 2007
Brisbane Powerhouse - Brisbane, Australia, June 1–7, 2007
Centro de Cultura Contemporánea de Barcelona - Barcelona, Spain. March 2007
Nuit Blanche - Paris, France. October 2008
ISSUE Project Room - Brooklyn, NY. April 2009
Documentai — Santa Monica, CA. April 2009

Controversy
In November 2018, Jordan filed a report to the Estonian police about a xenophobic attack against her in the Estonian capital Tallinn. Jordan said one of the attackers wore a badge of the right-radical political party EKRE. The police later issued a statement that they were unable to verify the report and started an investigation into Jordan instead. In the course of the criminal proceedings, it was confirmed that Mary Kross had knowingly given false testimony to the police on several occasions as a victim during the interrogation. Mary Kross was charged with making false statements.In October 2019 The Harju District Court ended the case against Jordan upon the request of the Prosecutor without charges. EKRE Chairman and Minister of Interior Mart Helme called the court ruling "absurd" and said the prosecution's motives to end the case look "politically motivated". Jordan issued a statement re-confirming that the attack against her had taken place, that she finds it shameful that the case turned into "media circus" instead of finding the culprits but she prefers not to spend more time on this and considers the case closed. She was fined €3000 for making false statements.

Personal life
Jordan is married to the Estonian politician and former Intelligence Chief Eerik-Niiles Kross. They were married at the St. Mary's Cathedral, Tallinn on August 11, 2011. The wordless ceremony was directed by a friend of the family and World's most performed living composer Arvo Pärt whose music was performed by the Vox Clamantis Choir. Bishop Urmas Viilma wed the couple. Guests included Chess Grandmaster Eric Lobron, Carmen Kass,  Chief of Defense General Riho Terras, Minister of Defence Mart Laar, Member of European Parliament Indrek Tarand Member of European Parliament, Ballet Prelocaj, artists from New York, London, Paris and Germany. The ceremony was the first of its kind making Kross and Jordan the only couple Arvo Pärt has ever married 

Jordan is an avid animal lover. She owns 4 dogs, 2 rabbits, 3 parrots and a lizard as pets. She is also an animal activist against killing of endangered species, dolphins, whales and over fishing.

Jordan has her own column in the newspaper in Estonia and writes articles on diverse subjects, from art to human rights.

References

External links

Entry on Mary Jordan in the Culturebase.net

1969 births
Living people
American women film directors
Film directors from New York City
American social activists
Activists from New York (state)